Neoregelia fosteriana is a species of flowering plant in the genus Neoregelia. This species is endemic to Brazil.

Cultivars 
 Neoregelia 'Bingo'
 Neoregelia 'Blythe Spirit'
 Neoregelia 'City Lights'
 Neoregelia 'Fair Lady'
 Neoregelia 'Far Superior'
 Neoregelia 'Far-Fost'
 Neoregelia 'Fost Prince'
 Neoregelia 'Fost-Far'
 Neoregelia 'Frank Sinatra'
 Neoregelia 'Green Rosette'
 Neoregelia 'Harmony'
 Neoregelia 'Hot Spice'
 Neoregelia 'Marvelous Party'
 Neoregelia 'Orchid'
 Neoregelia 'Powder Puff'
 Neoregelia 'Prince Fost'
 Neoregelia 'Purple Fancy'
 Neoregelia 'Rose Apple'
 Neoregelia 'Secret Heart'

References 

 
BSI Cultivar Registry Retrieved 11 October 2009

fosteriana
Endemic flora of Brazil